The raid on Abole oil exploration facility occurred in the early morning of April 24, 2007, when gunmen of the Ogaden National Liberation Front (ONLF) attacked the oil exploration facility of Zhongyuan Petroleum Exploration Bureau (ZPEB), a subsidiary of the China Petroleum & Chemical Corporation (Sinopec), in the town of Abole,  northwest of Degehabur, in the Somali Region of Ethiopia. 

The Abole attack came just as Ethiopian forces in Mogadishu were involved in fierce fighting with Somali insurgents. 65 Ethiopian soldiers and nine Chinese workers working for the ZPEB were killed in the attack.

See also
 Ogaden Basin
 Insurgency in Ogaden
 Ogaden War

References

External links

Insurgency in Ogaden
2007 in Ethiopia
April 2007 events in Africa